Reine Barkered (born 1982) is a big mountain skier from Duved, Sweden.

Barkered competed as an alpine ski racer before switching focus to freeride skiing in 2001. He did his first freeride competition, the Swedish big mountain championship in 2004, an event he won in 2006 also marking the last Swedish championship in the sport to date. He has competed in the Scandinavian big mountain championship (the world's oldest running freeride competition) since 2004.

In 2006 Barkered started competing on international level and in 2008 he qualified to the newly started Freeride World Tour. He ended up second overall in he's first year. He later earned the nickname 'the mayor of stomptown' and have a cliff named after him on Bec des Rosses, the mountain for the finals of the Freeride World Tour.

In 2012 Barkered won the overall Freeride World Tour claiming the world champion title and claimed the Transition Magazine award "Best Big Mountain Skier".

In 2017 he won his third Xtreme Verbier putting him in a group of handful of riders taking a win in this prestigious competition three times which, according to industry rumor give a lifetime wild card to the event.

In 2016 he married Freeride World Tour athlete Jackie Paaso.

Freeride World Tour results

Season standings

Race top results 

 1st Swedish big mountain Championship Funäsdalen 2006
 2nd Scandinavian big mountain championship Riksgränsen 2006
 2nd Freeride World Tour qualifier Montafon 2008
 1st Snowfever qualification Fieberbrunn 2008
 1st Lofoten Freeride 2008
 1st Hemsedal Freeride 2008 
 1st King of the mountain Norway freeride cup 2008
 1st Freeride World Tour Squaw valley 2009
 2nd Freeride World Tour Xtreme Verbier 2009
 3rd Freeride World Tour Squaw Valley 2010
 3rd Freeride World Tour Xtreme du Chamonix 2011
 2nd Freeride World Tour Big mountain Fieberbrunn 2011
 4th Freeride World Tour Xtreme Verbier 2011
 3rd Scandinavian Big mountain championship Riksgränsen 2011
 2nd FWT Freeride du Chamonix 12
 3rd FWT Fieberbrunn 12
 1st FWT Xtreme Verbier 12
 1st Overall Freeride World tour Champion 2012
 2nd Scandinavian Big mountain championship 2012
 3rd Freeride World Tour Courmayeur-Mont-Blanc 2013
 3rd Freeride World Tour Fieberbrunn Pillerseetal 2013
 2nd FWT Verbier Xtreme 2013
 2nd Overall Freeride World tour 2013
 2nd Scandinavian Big mountain championship Riksgränsen 2013
 1st FWT Xtreme Verbier 2014
 2nd Scandinavian Big mountain championship Riksgränsen 2014
 2nd Freeride World Tour Chamonix 2015
 3rd Freeride World Tour Andorra 2015
 2nd Freeride World Tour Xtreme Verbier 2015
 3rd Overall Freeride World Tour 2015
 3rd Freeride World Tour Fieberbrunn 2017
 1st FWT Xtreme Verbier 2017
 2nd Overall Freeride World Tour 2017
 4th Xtreme Verbier 2019
 3rd FWT Hakuba Japan 2020

Filmography 
 2009 RAD Films - Double UP
 2010 Second Hands - Second best friends
 2017 Winning run Xtreme Verbier

References 

Swedish male freestyle skiers
People from Åre Municipality
1982 births
Living people
Sportspeople from Jämtland County